Marcio Takara is a comic book artist known for his work on books such as Incorruptible, The Incredibles: Family Matters and Dynamo 5.

Career

Takara has named Stuart Immonen and Jim Lee among his artistic influences.

From 2010 to 2011, Takara is worked on Incorruptible for Boom! Studios, providing art for 16 issues in total beginning with Irredeemable No. 11. As of 2014, he is currently working on Captain Marvel for Marvel Comics.

Reception
Rich Johnston from bleedingcool.com praised Marcio's artwork in Family Matters comparing it to Kyle Baker and stating it has " wonderfully composed pages that make real emotional points, emphasis funny gags, and give a real sense of reality to these 2D versions of 3D CGI characters."

Technique and materials
Takara begins his pages with  ink thumbnail sketches with which he shows his overall ideas to his editor. When he begins the actual pencils, he keeps them "loose", because he will eventually ink over them himself, and does not require greater specificity. The penciling stage is the fastest stage for Takara, who does all of his pencil work with an HB 0.5 mechanical pencil, completing two or three penciled pages a day, sometimes even inking all three by the end of the day, which he does with Micron pens ranging in size from .005 to 1.0, Pentel brush pens and cheap brushes for filling in large black areas.

Personal life
In 2011 Takara moved from Toronto to Rio de Janeiro.

Selected bibliography
 The Incredibles: Family Matters (with writer Mark Waid, March to June 2009)

References

External links

 Marcio Takara – Homepage
 
 
 Interview with Marcio Takara – Sigmate Studio
 Interview with Marcio Takara
 Family Matters – Comic Vine
 Marcio Takara biography on Lambiek

Brazilian comics artists
Disney comics artists
Living people
Year of birth missing (living people)